The Washington State Patrol (WSP) is the state patrol agency for the U.S. state of Washington. Organized as the Washington State Highway Patrol in 1921, it was renamed and reconstituted in 1933. The agency is charged with the protection of the Governor of Washington and the grounds of the Washington State Capitol; security aboard the vessels and terminals of the Washington State Ferries; law enforcement on interstate and state highways in Washington; and providing specialized support to local law enforcement including laboratory forensic services, mobile field forces during periods of civil unrest or disaster, and tactical teams. The State Fire Marshal's Office, responsible for operation of the Washington State Fire Training Academy and for certain aspects of civil defense mobilization, is a component office of the Washington State Patrol, and the State Patrol is the managing agency of the Washington Fusion Center, which coordinates anti-terrorist and anti-organized crime activities within Washington.

State Patrol commissioned personnel, known as "troopers", have jurisdiction throughout Washington, with the exception of federal property and the territory of Indian nations.

History

The Washington State Highway Patrol was created by statute in 1921 to provide traffic enforcement on the state's principal motorways. In 1933 the force was reconstituted as the Washington State Patrol and organized as an armed, mobile police force that, in addition to traffic duties, could be rapidly deployed and concentrated in areas of the state undergoing public order emergencies. Six years later a Criminal Investigation Division was added and, in 1947, the WSP academy established in former U.S. Navy barracks in Shelton, Washington.

By the early 1960s the State Patrol had established a reputation as the state's most elite law enforcement agency, with more than 400 applicants annually applying for about 25 openings, and an annual turnover of about five percent. In 1965, the State Patrol was given sole jurisdiction of Interstate 5 through Seattle by the Seattle Police Department after previous collaboration.

In 1963 the Washington State Patrol began referring to its commissioned personnel as "troopers" instead of "patrolmen". The change was made to standardize practices in Washington with those of other states. In 1975 Cathy Swanson and Carolyn Pemberton, the first two female troopers, were commissioned. Twenty years later, in 1995, the first female chief of the State Patrol, Annette Sandberg, was appointed.

Organization

Administration
The State Patrol is administered by a chief who is appointed by the Governor of Washington to serve at his pleasure, by and with the consent of the state senate.

Rank structure

Specialized units
Specialized units of the State Patrol include SWAT, charged with providing tactical support in high-risk situations; the Rapid Deployment Forces, composed of five mobile field forces based in Tacoma, Bellevue, Spokane, Marysville, and Bremerton; the Motors Team, consisting of 42 motorcycle-deployed troopers operating on Interstate 5; the Honor Guard, providing ceremonial support during official funerals and other special events; and the Criminal Investigations Division and the Investigative Assistance Division, charged with investigating serious crimes or assisting local law enforcement in doing so, when requested.

The State Patrol also is responsible for management of the Washington Fusion Center, which coordinates anti-terrorist and anti-organized crime operations among federal, state, and local law enforcement in Washington.

Executive Services Section
The Executive Services Section consists of the Executive Protection Unit, charged with the protection of the Governor and his family, and the Governor-Elect; the Governor's Mansion Detachment, responsible for securing the grounds of the executive residence; and the Capitol Campus Detachment, which provides law enforcement on the 435-acre portion of the city of Olympia in which the primary government facilities, including the Washington State Capitol and the Temple of Justice, are located.

Vessel and Terminal Security (VATS)
Vessel and Terminal Security (VATS) is divided into three operating regions – Bremerton, Marysville, and Seattle – and is tasked with providing shipboard law enforcement on Washington State Ferries vessels, monitoring a network of CCTV cameras deployed aboard vessels and at ferry terminals, and screening passengers and passenger vehicles prior to embarkation.

Personnel

Training
Candidates to become state troopers first undergo seven weeks of "arming training" which is conducted at the 190-acre Washington State Patrol Academy in Shelton. During this period, candidates undergo extensive physical training, as well as firearms orientation and defensive techniques. Upon successful completion of arming training, candidates are advanced to a Trooper Basic Cadet Class which consists of 18 weeks of classroom instruction covering water rescue, emergency vehicle operation, collision and crime scene investigation, criminal law, and other topics in police science. The course concludes with a further eight weeks of field training during which the cadet works alongside a veteran trooper during the course of his or her regular duties.

Following completion of the 33 weeks of arming training and the Trooper Basic Cadet Course, candidates are administered the Troopers' Oath in the rotunda of the Washington State Capitol by the Chief Justice of the Washington Supreme Court and then commissioned as peace officers by the Governor of Washington.

The Washington State Patrol Academy is used to exclusively train State Patrol troopers; all other law enforcement officers in the state are trained by the Washington Criminal Justice Training Commission (CJTC) Law Enforcement Academy. However, the CJTC utilizes the State Patrol Academy and its EVOC instructors for its nationally acclaimed emergency vehicle operations course. Unlike the CJTC academy, the WSP academy is a residential academy and cadets are barracked on-campus during training.

Troopers' Oath
The Troopers' Oath is:

Equipment

Uniforms
Commissioned personnel of the Washington State Highway Patrol began wearing uniforms – consisting of grey jackets and riding breeches with brown leather accessories – in 1924, three years after the force was established. Prior to this personnel wore civilian attire with metal badges. In 1928 the Highway Patrol's uniforms switched to a green pattern with black leather accoutrements. In 1937, four years after the force was reconstituted as the Washington State Patrol, blue uniforms were adopted and neckties were replaced with bowties; the longer form of neckwear had a tendency to flap in the breeze when a trooper was on motorcycle duty. The State Patrol switched from wearing peaked hats to campaign hats in 1963.

In 2007 the National Association of Uniform Manufacturers and Distributors named the Washington State Patrol the "Best-Dressed State Law Enforcement Agency" in the United States. The State Patrol adopted a modified duty uniform in 2017. Though visually similar to the State Patrol's former uniforms, the new uniforms were constructed of a breathable, sweat-wicking fabric, instead of wool. According to the State Patrol, the modified uniform was adopted as it was easier to clean and more comfortable to wear.

Vehicles

In the early 1980s, the State Patrol operated the Dodge Diplomat, with several Ford Mustangs arriving in 1983. From the late 1980s to 2012, the Ford Crown Victoria was its primary vehicle. Beginning in 2012, this model began to be cycled out in favor of the Chevrolet Caprice PPV. The Patrol currently uses Ford Police Package Explorers, harkening back to their original use panel vans for patrol duties. 

The State Patrol also operates two Bearcat armored vehicles for tactical operations.

As of 2017, the Aviation Section managed a fleet of seven fixed wing aircraft which operate under the call sign "Smokey".

Communications 
Washington State Patrol has its own statewide analog, non-trunked, repeater-based, VHF radio network that covers the state.  Towers for this network can be seen near highways and look like cell sites, but with longer antennas. However, as of January 1, 2013, all radio systems used by WSP will move to a conventional digital format called P25 and all old analog equipment will be taken out of service. In August, 2004, one of these towers near Vancouver, Washington was damaged by an arsonist, taking out Washington State Patrol communications in Clark County.

Washington State Patrol dispatchers handle statewide law enforcement dispatching and radio communications for the Washington State Patrol, Fish & Wildlife Police Officers of the Washington Department of Fish & Wildlife ("Wildlife" units), Law Enforcement Officers of the Washington Department of Natural Resources ("DNR" units), Law Enforcement Officers of the US Forest Service ("Forest" units), Federal Wildlife Officers of the US Fish & Wildlife Service, Liquor Enforcement Officers of the Liquor and Cannabis Board ("Liquor" units), Park Rangers of the Washington State Parks ("Parks" units), and the WSDOT incident response team ("Transportation" units), which work closely with WSP.

Laboratories 
Washington State Patrol operates seven crime laboratories:  full-service labs in Seattle, Tacoma, Marysville and Cheney, and limited-service laboratories in Vancouver, Kennewick and Tumwater. The Washington State Patrol crime lab system provides service to all city and county law enforcement agencies in the state.

State Fire Marshal 
Operating under the Washington State Patrol, the Office of the State Fire Marshal, Fire Protection Bureau, provides services to fire districts, government agencies, members of the media, and the general public. These services include:
fire incident reporting and data collection
fire code review and adoption
construction plan review for fire sprinkler and alarm systems
fire inspections of high risk occupancies housing elderly and vulnerable populations

In addition, the Fire Protection Bureau regulates the fireworks and sprinkler industry through a licensing program.

Washington State Patrol operates the Washington State Fire Training Academy, which provides high-risk fire training to fire departments and fire protection districts. In addition, they provide a Certification Program through a standards and accreditation process. The Fire Protection Bureau also provides coordination of Washington State fire service resources for mobilization during natural or human-caused disasters. Hazardous materials training, fire and life safety prevention education, and public information services are also responsibilities of the Fire Protection Bureau.

Firearms 
Currently the standard sidearm issued for state troopers is the Smith & Wesson M&P 2.0 in 9mm which replaced older M&P .40 S&W handguns which had been in service since 2009 when they replaced the Heckler & Koch USP .40 S&W. Prior to the USP .40 caliber pistols, troopers were armed with the Beretta 92 9mm pistols until around 2003 when the USP pistols were phased in. Prior to that, troopers were issued S&W Model 27 N-Frame 6" barreled revolvers carried in cross-draw holsters (these holsters were phased out in the early 80's when troopers were given the choice to carry personally owned 4" barreled K frame Model 19/66 revolvers). WSP troopers also carry  Remington 870 12-gauge police magnum shotguns, and AR-15 rifles in their cruisers.  Additionally, HK MP5 submachine guns are used (but only by WSP SWAT and other specialty units).

Controversies 
Eight troopers faced termination in a fake diploma scam discovered in 2009. Troopers who had earned a two-year degree were entitled to a 2% pay raise and those who had earned a bachelor's were entitled to a 4% pay raise. Eight troopers, who were identified during the course of a federal investigation into a diploma mill, were discovered to have submitted fake diplomas along with applications for a pay increase. A State Patrol spokesman reported that the agency intended to fire the troopers.

Fallen officers 
Thirty commissioned personnel of the State Patrol, and its predecessor the Highway Patrol, have died in the line of duty. Patrolman Vernon G. Fortin was the first killed, dying in 1923 following a motorcycle crash. Five personnel have fallen to gunfire; Patrolman John H. Gulden was the first to die of gunshot, which he received while attempting to apprehend a pair of robbers in 1942.

See also 

 List of law enforcement agencies in Washington (state)
 Highway patrol

References

External links 

Washington State Law Enforcement Memorial

State Patrol
Government agencies established in 1921
1921 establishments in Washington (state)